Christmas Island is Jimmy Buffett's first Christmas album and is his twenty-first studio album overall. It features covers of popular Christmas songs in Buffett's musical stylings as well as two tracks which Buffett wrote for the album. "Twas the Night Before Christmas" is a hidden track. It was his last release with MCA Records.

Critical reception
Reviews tend to be mixed for the album. In a positive review, a reviewer states that "[Christmas Island] will have you on your feet all through the holidays." Rob O'Connor states that "this may not be the traditional Christmas fare of chestnuts roasting on an open fire, but for those who enjoy ocean breezes and 'wasting away' to this most successful beach bum, Christmas Island is exactly what the cruise director ordered."  Thom Owens presents a more negative view of the album, describing Buffett as being "relaxed and entertaining" even though, "few of his new Christmas songs are remarkable and his rearrangements of classic carols are rather forced."  However, several tracks remain very popular around the Christmas season.  "Ho Ho Ho & A Bottle Of Rum" was the track chosen to be played live for promoting the album when first released, and seems to remain the most popular off the album.  Although no singles were released, "Jingle Bells", "Mele Kalikimaka", "Ho Ho Ho & a Bottle of Rum", "Merry Christmas, Alabama (Never Far from Home)" and the title track get considerable amount of radio airplay during the season.

Track listing

Charts

Weekly charts

Year-end charts

Personnel
Adapted from AllMusic.

Vocals and musicians

Jimmy Buffett – all vocals, guitar
Melanie Prestidge - background vocals
Claudia Cummings – background vocals
Tina Gullickson – background vocals
Peter Mayer – background vocals
Nadirah Shakoor – background vocals
Robert Greenidge – Steelpan, percussion
Roger Guth – Drums
Ralph McDonald – Percussion
Jim Mayer – Bass, upright bass
Peter Mayer – Guitar, ukulele
Tom Mitchell – Saxophone
Greg "Fingers" Taylor – Harmonica
Michael Utley –  Keyboards

Production and design

Alvin Booth – photography
Jimmy Buffett – arranger
Milton Dean – photography
Rob Eaton – engineer, mixing
Joe Hayden – second engineer
Abi Hodes – photography
Ted Jensen – mastering
Russ Kunkel – producer
Joe Lizzi – second engineer
John Lovell – horn arrangements
Tom Mitchell – horn arrangements 
Jean Pagliuso – photography
Michael Ramos – production coordination 
Sunshine Smith – coordination
Michael Utley – arrangements, producer, string arrangements
Brad Wilson – photography

References

Jimmy Buffett albums
1996 Christmas albums
Christmas albums by American artists
Albums produced by Michael Utley
Albums produced by Russ Kunkel
Country Christmas albums
MCA Records albums
Pop rock Christmas albums